Zlatko Muhović (born 8 November 1990) is a retired Bosnian-Herzegovinian footballer and the assistant manager of Fortuna Köln.

Playing career
Muhović began his career with Alemannia Aachen, and played for their reserve team for eighteen months before joining FC Schalke 04 II in 2010. Two years later he signed for SC Wiedenbrück, where he had successful season, promptly signing for SC Preußen Münster of the 3. Liga. He made his debut at this level in the second game of the 2013–14 season, as a substitute for Matt Taylor in a 2–2 draw with RB Leipzig. After two appearances in six months for Münster, he signed for SSV Jahn Regensburg in January 2014. After being suspended by the club in January 2015, his contract was cancelled on 28 January 2015.

Coaching career
After retiring at the end of the 2018-19 season, SC Fortuna Köln announced, that Muhović had joined the club as assistant manager.

References

External links

1990 births
Living people
People from Kragujevac
Bosnia and Herzegovina footballers
Association football midfielders
3. Liga players
Regionalliga players
Alemannia Aachen players
FC Schalke 04 II players
SC Wiedenbrück 2000 players
SC Preußen Münster players
SSV Jahn Regensburg players
Berliner FC Dynamo players
SC Verl players
1. FC Kaan-Marienborn players
Bosnia and Herzegovina expatriate footballers
Bosnia and Herzegovina expatriate sportspeople in Germany
Expatriate footballers in Germany